Cook Islands  competed at the 2014 Summer Youth Olympics, in Nanjing, China from 16 August to 28 August 2014.

Golf

Cook Islands was given a team of 2 athletes to compete from the Tripartite Commission.

Individual

Team

Sailing

Cook Islands qualified one boat based on its performance at the Byte CII Oceania Continental Qualifiers.

Swimming

Cook Islands qualified one swimmer.

Boys

References

2014 in Cook Islands sport
Nations at the 2014 Summer Youth Olympics
Cook Islands at the Youth Olympics